Ana Ayala (born 16 December 1969) is a Mexican diver. She competed in the women's 3 metre springboard event at the 1992 Summer Olympics.

References

External links
 

1969 births
Living people
Mexican female divers
Olympic divers of Mexico
Divers at the 1992 Summer Olympics
Place of birth missing (living people)